Municipal elections were held in Montenegro on 17 April in Tivat and on 16 October in Andrijevica, Budva, Gusinje and Kotor.

Results

April elections

Tivat

This election was boycotted by several opposition parties and coalitions due to unfair conditions.

Elected mayor: Snežana Matijević (DPS)

October elections

Budva

Elected mayor: Dragan Krapović (Democrats)

Kotor

Elected mayor: Vladimir Jokić (Democrats)

Andrijevica

Elected mayor: Srđan Mašović (DPS)

Gusinje

Elected mayor: Anela Čekić (DPS)

References

2016 in Montenegro
April 2016 events in Europe
October 2016 events in Europe
Local elections in Montenegro